Bettie Johnson Mbayo is a Liberian journalist and a senior reporter at FrontPage Africa. In 2019 she won the  Health Reporter and Women Rights Reporter of the year from the Press Union of Liberia.

Mbayo obtained a Bachelor of Arts (BA) degree in Mass Communication from the United Methodist University in Liberia and a Master's in Public administration.

References 

Living people
United Methodist University alumni
21st-century Liberian writers
21st-century Liberian women writers
Year of birth missing (living people)